Richard Lane (2 January 1794 at Langham, Essex – 26 January 1870 at Hove, Sussex) was an English amateur cricketer who played first-class cricket from 1820 to 1824.  He was mainly associated with Marylebone Cricket Club (MCC), of which he was a member.  He made 4 known appearances in first-class matches.

References

Bibliography
 Arthur Haygarth, Scores & Biographies, Volume 1 (1744-1826), Lillywhite, 1862

External links
 

1794 births
1870 deaths
English cricketers
English cricketers of 1787 to 1825
Marylebone Cricket Club cricketers
Gentlemen cricketers
People from Langham, Essex
Marylebone Cricket Club Second 10 with 1 Other cricketers
Non-international England cricketers
Marylebone Cricket Club First 9 with 3 Others cricketers